Inditherium is an extinct genus of dromatheriid cynodonts that lived in what is now India during the Late Triassic. Its type and only species is Inditherium floris, which is known from three postcanine teeth discovered at the Tiki Formation of Madhya Pradesh.

Etymology
The generic name Inditherium is derived from the country of India and the Greek word , meaning "beast". The specific epithet floris is a reference to the flower-shaped crowns of its postcanine teeth.

References

Prehistoric prozostrodonts
Prehistoric cynodont genera
Late Triassic synapsids
Triassic synapsids of Asia
Triassic India
Fossils of India
Fossil taxa described in 2020